The Caribbean pine (Pinus caribaea) is a hard pine species native to Central America and the northern West Indies (in Cuba, the Bahamas, and the Turks and Caicos Islands). It belongs to subsection Australes in subgenus Pinus. It inhabits tropical and subtropical coniferous forests such as Bahamian pineyards, in both lowland savannas and montane forests.

Taxonomy
As of 2013, the species has three accepted varieties:
Pinus caribaea var. caribaea – pino macho, Caribbean pine, Nicaragua pine, pitch pine (Pinar del Río Province and Isla de la Juventud in western Cuba)
Pinus caribaea var. bahamensis (Grisebach) W.H.Barrett & Golfari – Bahamas pine, Caicos pine, Caribbean pine (The Bahamas, Turks and Caicos Islands)
Pinus caribaea var. hondurensis (Sénéclauze) W.H.Barrett & Golfari – Caribbean pine (states of Quintana Roo and the Yucatán in Mexico, Belize, Guatemala, El Salvador, Honduras, Nicaragua). The Yucatán population is also considered to be the nominate variety.

Distribution
It has been proposed that the pines of Australes subsection (of which Caribbean pine is part) arrived to the Caribbean basin from the southeastern United States. Regarding the population in the Bahamas, it has been proposed that this species emigrated into the region from Florida four or five thousand years ago, long after the end of the Ice Age, as the climate became wetter. Based on fossil species assemblages it is believed that the environment on the Bahamas was much less forested and a dry savannah during the glacial maxim some 18,000 years ago when the sea level was some  lower than it is today.

Paleoclimatic and genetic data have been used to propose that P. caribaea ultimately originated in Central America. According to chloroplast genetic data, P. caribaea lineages colonized the Caribbean islands from populations in Central America at least twice (one leading to Cuban populations and another leading to the populations on the Bahamas).

Ecology
Periodic wildfires play a major role in the distribution of this species; this tree regenerates quickly and aggressively, replacing broadleaf trees after fires. In zones not subject to periodic fires, the succession continues and the pine forest is replaced by tropical broadleaf forest. The young pines require extensive amounts of sunlight to grow, and are resistant to fire once they become adults.

Uses
Lumber and pulpwood from this tree shipped to Florida is the main export of the Abaco Islands.

Conservation
According to the International Union for Conservation of Nature, this species as a whole is considered of least concern, but two of the three varieties are considered endangered (var. caribaea) or vulnerable (var. bahamensis).

References

Pinus
Pinus taxa by common names
Trees of the Bahamas
Trees of Belize
Trees of Cuba
Trees of El Salvador
Trees of Guatemala
Trees of Honduras
Trees of Nicaragua
Trees of Quintana Roo
Flora of the Turks and Caicos Islands
Least concern flora of North America